The 2010–11 Venezuelan Professional Baseball League season ( or LVBP) was contested in two round robin league phases and a playoff final.

First league phase
This round is called "Ronda Eliminatoria" or  "Regular" by the league.

It was played from 12 October to 30 December.

The first five teams advanced to the second league phase.

Offensive and defensive leaders

Pitching
 Earned run average: Andrew Baldwin (Caribes) 2.08
 Wins: Yorman Bazardo (Tigres) 7

Batting
 Home runs: Luis Jiménez (Cardenales) 12
 Batting average: Josh Kroeger (Leones) 369

Second league phase
This round is called "Round Robin" or "Semi-final" by the league.

It was intended to be played from January, 2nd to January, 21st, but Aragua and Caracas ended in a tie, and had to play an extra tie-breaking game on 22 January. The extra game was played in Caracas because the Leones had finished with a better record during the first phase of the tournament.

The top two teams classified to the championship series.

(*) Aragua and Caracas played an extra, tie-breaking game to decide who would play against Anzoátegui in the final after finishing with a 10–6 record during the round robin/semi final phase. The extra game was played on 22 January 2011, in Caracas' "Universitario" stadium, with victory for the away team, Tigres de Aragua, with a 5–2 score.

Championship series

Games:

The Caribes de Anzoátegui were crowned LVBP 2010-2011 Champions. This is the first title in the franchise's 20-year history.

The Championship Series' MVP was Luis Jiménez, who was playing for the Caribes as a reinforcement.

Awards
 Most Valuable Player (Víctor Davalillo Award): Josh Kroeger (Leones del Caracas)
 Overall Offensive Performer of the year: Luis Jiménez (Cardenales de Lara)
 Rookie of the year: José Pirela (Aguilas del Zulia)
 Comeback of the year: Yusmeiro Petit (Bravos de Margarita)
 Manager of the year (Chico Carrasquel Award): Jody Davis (Aguilas del Zulia)
 Pitcher of the year (Carrao Bracho Award): Andrew Baldwin (Caribes de Anzoátegui)
 Closer of the year: Ronald Belisario (Bravos de Margarita)
 Setup of the year: Luis Ramírez (Bravos de Margarita)

Highlights
 On 21 November, Navegantes del Magallanes pitcher Anthony Lerew, completed a no hit/no run game against Magallanes' nemesis Leones del Caracas. The final score was 6–0. This was the 16th no-hitter game in the history of the league, and the 12th achieved by one pitcher during the whole game.
 Caribes de Anzoátegui – one of the newer teams in the league – won their first championship after reaching the final for the second time (first one in 2003–2004); both of these finals have been against the Tigres de Aragua, team that reached its 15th final, and 8th in the last nine years.
 Caribes also managed to repeat a feat that hadn't been seen in the league since the 1988-89 tournament. That year, Águilas del Zulia just like Caribes in this tournament, managed to win the title after ending last in the previous season.

Notes

External links
Official League Website

LVBP seasons
Venezuelan Professional Baseball League season
Venezuelan Professional Baseball League season